Cedar Creek may refer to:

In Australia
 Cedar Creek (New South Wales), a tributary of the Hunter River catchment, New South Wales
 Cedar Creek, New South Wales, a town in the City of Cessnock
 Cedar Creek, New South Wales (Tweed), a village in Tweed Shire
 Cedar Creek, Queensland (Moreton Bay Region), a suburb in the Moreton Bay Region, Queensland
 Cedar Creek, Queensland (Logan & Gold Coast), a suburb split by the Logan City and Gold Coast City boundaries, Queensland
 Cedar Creek, former name of Ravenshoe, Queensland

In the United States

In Alabama
Cedar Creek Reservoir (Alabama)

In Arkansas
Cedar Creek, Arkansas, an unincorporated community

In California
Cedar Creek (Pacheco Creek)), a tributary of Pacheco Creek in Santa Clara County
Cedar Creek (South Fork Eel River), a tributary of the South Fork Eel River in Mendocino County
Cedar Creek (South Fork Pit River), a tributary of the Pit River in Lassen County
Cedar Creek, the fictional setting of the 1995 film Outbreak.

In Connecticut
Cedar Creek (Connecticut), lake-like tidal creek in Fairfield County

In Delaware
Cedar Creek, Delaware
Cedar Creek Hundred, an unincorporated subdivision of Sussex County, Delaware

In Georgia
Cedar Creek (Georgia), a stream in Floyd and Polk counties
Cedar Creek, the former name for Vickery Creek, a tributary of the Chattahoochee River

In Indiana
Cedar Creek (Indiana), a tributary of the St. Joseph River in the Lake Erie watershed
Cedar Creek Canyon (Indiana)

In Iowa
Cedar Creek (Skunk River tributary), a tributary of the Skunk River

In Kansas
Cedar Creek (Kansas)

In Kentucky
Cedar Creek (Dix River)
Cedar Creek Lake (Kentucky)

In Michigan
Cedar Creek (Michigan)

In Minnesota
Cedar Creek (Mississippi River), a stream in Winona County
Cedar Creek Ecosystem Science Reserve, a long-term biodiversity research preserve

In Missouri
Cedar Creek, Missouri, an unincorporated community
Cedar Creek (Big River tributary)
Cedar Creek (Current River tributary)
Cedar Creek (Des Moines River tributary)
Cedar Creek (Henry County, Missouri)
Cedar Creek (Bull Shoals Lake tributary)
Cedar Creek (Loose Creek tributary)
Cedar Creek (Missouri River tributary)
Cedar Creek (Sac River tributary)
Cedar Creek (Salt Creek tributary)
Cedar Creek (Shoal Creek tributary)

In Nebraska
Cedar Creek, Nebraska, a city
Cedar Creek (Platte River tributary), a stream in Nebraska

In New Jersey
Cedar Creek (Barnegat Bay), a tributary of Barnegat Bay in Ocean County
Cedar Creek (Delaware Bay), an estuary of Delaware Bay in Cumberland County
Cedar Creek High School (New Jersey), a high school in Egg Harbor City, New Jersey

In New York
 Cedar Creek Park (Seaford), a Nassau County, Long Island park located on Merrick Road east of Wantagh Avenue

In North Carolina
Cedar Creek (Deep River tributary, Chatham), a stream in Chatham County, North Carolina
Cedar Creek (Cape Fear River tributary), a stream in Harnett County, North Carolina
Cedar Creek (Uwharrie River tributary), a stream in Montgomery County, North Carolina
Cedar Creek (Deep River tributary, Moore), a stream in Moore County, North Carolina

In North Dakota
Cedar Creek (North Dakota), a tributary of the Cannonball River

In Ohio
Cedar Creek Mine Ride, roller coaster

In Oklahoma
Cedar Creek Golf Course at Beavers Bend

In Pennsylvania
Cedar Creek (Youghiogheny River tributary), a stream in Westmoreland County

In Texas
Cedar Creek (Trinity River tributary)
Cedar Creek Reservoir (Texas)
Cedar Creek (Johnson County, Texas)
Cedar Creek, Texas, an unincorporated community in Bastrop County

In Utah
Cedar Creek, Utah, a ghost town

In Virginia
Cedar Creek (James River), a tributary of the James River
Cedar Creek (North Fork Shenandoah River), a tributary of the North Fork Shenandoah River
Battle of Cedar Creek, American Civil War
Cedar Creek and Belle Grove National Historical Park, a site commemorating the battle

In West Virginia
Cedar Creek (West Virginia), a tributary of the Little Kanawha River
Cedar Creek State Park

In Wisconsin
Cedar Creek, Wisconsin, an unincorporated community
Cedar Creek (Wisconsin), a tributary of the Milwaukee River

See also

Cedar Creek Township (disambiguation)
Cedar Branch
Cedar Brook (disambiguation)
Cedar Fork (disambiguation)
Cedar River (disambiguation)
Cedar Run (disambiguation)